In enzymology, an acyl-[acyl-carrier-protein]-UDP-N-acetylglucosamine O-acyltransferase is an enzyme that catalyzes the chemical reaction

(R)-3-hydroxytetradecanoyl-[acyl-carrier-protein] + UDP-N-acetylglucosamine  [acyl-carrier-protein] + UDP-3-O-(3-hydroxytetradecanoyl)-N-acetylglucosamine

Thus, the two substrates of this enzyme are (R)-3-hydroxytetradecanoyl-acyl-carrier-protein and UDP-N-acetylglucosamine, whereas its two products are acyl-carrier-protein and UDP-3-O-(3-hydroxytetradecanoyl)-N-acetylglucosamine.

This enzyme belongs to the family of transferases, specifically those acyltransferases transferring groups other than aminoacyl groups.  The systematic name of this enzyme class is (R)-3-hydroxytetradecanoyl-[acyl-carrier-protein]:UDP-N-acetylglucosamine 3-O-(3-hydroxytetradecanoyl) transferase. Other names in common use include UDP-N-acetylglucosamine acyltransferase and uridine diphosphoacetylglucosamine acyltransferase.  This enzyme participates in lipopolysaccharide biosynthesis.

Structural studies

References

 

EC 2.3.1
Enzymes of known structure